Duey River may refer to:

Duey River (San Germán, Puerto Rico)
Duey River (Yauco, Puerto Rico)